The 2002 VCU Rams men's soccer team represented Virginia Commonwealth University in all 2002 NCAA Division I men's college soccer competitions.

Background

Team

Roster 

As of June 8, 2011.

Coaching staff

Competitions 
Key

Preseason

Regular season

CAA standings

Results summary

Results by round

Games 

Source: VCURams.VCU.edu

CAA Tournament 

Source: VCURams.VCU.edu

NCAA Tournament

Statistics

Appearances and goals 

Last updated on 7 November.

|}

See also 
 Virginia Commonwealth University
 VCU Rams
 VCU Rams men's soccer
 NCAA Division I Men's Soccer Championship
 CAA Men's Soccer Tournament

References 
Footnotes
A.  For record-keeping, elimination matches that go into a penalty shoot-out count as draws.
Citations

External links 
 VCU Rams 2002 schedule and results

VCU Rams men's soccer seasons
2002 in sports in Virginia
Vcu
Vcu
American soccer clubs 2002 season